The Corpse in the Car is a 1935 detective novel by John Rhode, the pen name of the British writer Cecil Street. It is the twentieth in his long-running series of novels featuring Lancelot Priestley, a Golden Age armchair detective. A review by Ralph Partridge in the New Statesman commented "Mr. Rhode has written a humdrum, workaday book in The Corpse in the Car. He belongs to the English school of Freeman Wills Crofts, with which it is impossible to find technical fault." In The Spectator Rupert Hart-Davis considered that "The Corpse in the Car is greatly inferior to his last book, Shot at Dawn."

Synopsis
The imperious Lady Misterton goes out for her usual drive in Windsor Great Park on a cold February afternoon. However realising she has forgotten her bag she sends her chauffeur back on foot for a considerable distance to retrieve it. When he returns to the car he finds his employer dead, perhaps due to natural causes or possibly due to murder.

References

Bibliography
 Evans, Curtis. Masters of the "Humdrum" Mystery: Cecil John Charles Street, Freeman Wills Crofts, Alfred Walter Stewart and the British Detective Novel, 1920-1961. McFarland, 2014.
 Herbert, Rosemary. Whodunit?: A Who's Who in Crime & Mystery Writing. Oxford University Press, 2003.
 Reilly, John M. Twentieth Century Crime & Mystery Writers. Springer, 2015.

1935 British novels
Novels by Cecil Street
British crime novels
British mystery novels
British thriller novels
British detective novels
Collins Crime Club books
Novels set in Berkshire
Windsor Great Park
Dodd, Mead & Co. books